Pachehlak-e Sharqi Rural District is a rural district (dehestan) in the Central District of Aligudarz County, Lorestan Province, Iran. At the 2006 census, its population was 6,478, in 1,262 families.  The rural district has 20 villages.

References 

Rural Districts of Lorestan Province
Aligudarz County